Yekaterina Sergeyevna Lebedeva (born 14 September 1989 in Yekaterinburg, Russian SSR, Soviet Union) is a Russian ice hockey forward.

On December 12, 2017 she and five other Russian hockey players were disqualified with their results at the 2014 Olympics annulled.

International career
Lebedeva was selected for the Russia national women's ice hockey team in the 2010 Winter Olympics. She played in all five games, recording one assist.

Lebedeva has also appeared for Russia at six IIHF Women's World Championships. Her first appearance came in 2007. She was a member of the team that won a bronze medal at the 2013 IIHF Women's World Championship.

Career statistics

International career

References

External links
Eurohockey.com Profile
Sports-Reference Profile

1989 births
Living people
Ice hockey players at the 2010 Winter Olympics
Ice hockey players at the 2014 Winter Olympics
Olympic ice hockey players of Russia
Sportspeople from Yekaterinburg
Russian women's ice hockey forwards
Universiade medalists in ice hockey
Doping cases in ice hockey
Russian sportspeople in doping cases
Sportspeople banned for life
Universiade gold medalists for Russia
Competitors at the 2015 Winter Universiade